Anuradha Choudhary (born 29 August 1960) is a politician in Uttar Pradesh, India. She has been a minister in Uttar Pradesh, and also a member of Lok Sabha. She started her career with Ajit Singh's Rashtriya Lok Dal, joined Samajwadi Party in 2012, and joined Bharatiya Janata Party in 2015.

Political life
In 2002 she was elected as the M.L.A. from Baghra and became the PWD minister in the state of Uttar Pradesh. In 2004 she was elected as the MP for Kairana on a Rashtriya Lok Dal ticket. She lost 2009 Lok Sabha election from Muzaffarnagar.

In January 2012 before the Uttar Pradesh Legislative Assembly elections, Anuradha quit the Rashtriya Lok Dal to join Samajwadi Party and was appointed the national general secretary of the party. She was stripped of the status of minister in UP after the party's big defeat in Lok Sabha polls in May 2014, whereupon she quit the party. 

In January 2015, she joined the Bharatiya Janata Party.

References

External links
Anuradha Choudhary affidavit

1960 births
Living people
People from Muzaffarnagar
India MPs 2004–2009
Lok Sabha members from Uttar Pradesh
Uttar Pradesh MLAs 2002–2007
Women in Uttar Pradesh politics
Bharatiya Janata Party politicians from Uttar Pradesh
21st-century Indian women politicians
21st-century Indian politicians
Rashtriya Lok Dal politicians
Samajwadi Party politicians from Uttar Pradesh